Nordahl Eriksen Wallem (10 November 1902 – 9 December 1972) was a Norwegian sailor who competed in the 1936 Summer Olympics.

In 1936 he won the silver medal as crew member of the Norwegian boat Silja in the 8 metre class event.

References

External links 
 
 

1902 births
1972 deaths
Norwegian male sailors (sport)
Olympic sailors of Norway
Sailors at the 1936 Summer Olympics – 8 Metre
Olympic silver medalists for Norway
Olympic medalists in sailing

Medalists at the 1936 Summer Olympics